Merkel Mill Complex is a historic grist mill complex located in Richmond Township, Berks County, Pennsylvania.  The complex consists of the -story, stone banked mill with tin roof (1854); -story, stone Georgian-style manor house (1767); large stone and frame barn with banked earth ramp (c. 1850); one-story smokehouse with slate roof (c. 1767); -story stone summer kitchen (c. 1767); clapboarded frame privy (c. 1939); storage shed (c. 1939); and the millraces, dam, and pond. The mill ceased operation about 1939. The mill was built as part of a working farm.

It was listed on the National Register of Historic Places in 1990.

References

Grinding mills in Berks County, Pennsylvania
Grinding mills on the National Register of Historic Places in Pennsylvania
1767 establishments in Pennsylvania
Houses completed in 1767
Industrial buildings completed in 1854
Houses in Berks County, Pennsylvania
National Register of Historic Places in Berks County, Pennsylvania